Severe Tropical Storm Merbok, was a tropical cyclone that impacted southern China in June 2017. Merbok developed out of a tropical depression which was first monitored by the JMA while it was west of Manila, Philippines, on June 10. The system soon was monitored as 04W by the JTWC. The depression then strengthened into Tropical Storm Merbok before making landfall in eastern Shenzhen, China. Merbok then weakened before dissipating over China on June 13.

Merbok caused tropical storm-force winds in Hong Kong, as the center of the storm passed nearby. Merbok also caused property damage and agricultural  damage across Guangdong Province. Total economic losses from Merbok were counted to be CN¥600 million (US$88.3 million).

Meteorological history

The system was in a marginal environment for development, with satellite imagery showing scattered convection around a poorly organized circulation. By June 10, conditions began to improve and the system began to organize, with the JTWC upgrading its development potential within the next day to medium. On the same day at 06:00 UTC, the Japan Meteorological Agency (JMA) began issuing advisories on a tropical depression. At this time, the system was located within favorable conditions for further development, though its circulation still remained broad. On June 11 at 03:00 UTC, the JTWC issued its first warning on Tropical Depression 04W as it continued to organize, with cloud tops in the central dense overcast deepening.

Shortly after at 06:00 UTC, the JMA upgraded the depression to a tropical storm, giving it the name Merbok. Advanced Scatterometer data from the MetOp-B satellite at 13:14 UTC showed tropical-storm-force winds in the eastern quadrants of the storm, and at 15:00 UTC, the JTWC also upgraded Merbok to a tropical storm. Merbok continued tracking to the north-northwest influenced by a subtropical steering ridge, and on June 12 at 12:00 UTC, the JMA upgraded Merbok to a severe tropical storm. Merbok made landfall on the city of Shenzhen at 14-15:00 UTC, with the JMA downgrading it to a severe tropical storm at 18:00 UTC and the JTWC issuing its final advisory on Merbok at 21:00 UTC. The JMA later issued its final advisory on the system on the next day at 00:00 UTC as it weakened into a tropical depression, with its remnants dissipating inland at 12:00 UTC.

Preparations and impact

Hong Kong
A Signal No. 1 warning was put in place for Hong Kong when Merbok first formed. This was upgraded to a Signal No. 8 warning by the time the storm made landfall.

10 people were injured in Hong Kong due to Merbok. During the storm's passage there were 600 reports of fallen trees, 20 reports of flooding, and 2 reports of landslides. An aluminum window fell off a building in To Kwa Wan, damaging two cars beneath it. Numerous roads were flooded causing major traffic issues on the morning of June 13. A retaining wall along Tai Tam Road in Stanley collapsed due to the heavy rainfall produced by Merbok. Over 500 flights at the Hong Kong International Airport were affected by the storm.

China
A blue alert was issued as Merbok approached China on June 12.

Across Guangdong Province, 32 homes were destroyed, 122,000 people reported property damage, 13,000 hectares of crops flooded, and roughly 155,000 households lost electricity. Total economic losses in South China were counted to be CN¥600 million (US$88.3 million).

See also

Tropical cyclones in 2017
Tropical Storm Mekkhala (2020)

References

Storms
Southeast Asia
Merbok